(born April 11, 1971 in Tokyo, Japan) is a Japanese rugby union footballer. He plays rugby as blindside flanker or no.8 for Kobelco Steelers in the Japanese Top League and also in the Japan national rugby union team. He played in both the 1999 and 2003 World Cups.

References 

1971 births
Living people
Japanese rugby union players
Kobelco Kobe Steelers players
Sportspeople from Tokyo
Japan international rugby union players
Asian Games medalists in rugby union
Rugby union players at the 1998 Asian Games
Rugby union players at the 2002 Asian Games
Asian Games silver medalists for Japan
Medalists at the 1998 Asian Games
Medalists at the 2002 Asian Games
Japan international rugby sevens players